Jonathan Santiago (born 9 June 1994) is a French professional footballer who plays as a midfielder.

Club career
Born in Marseille, Santiago made his professional debut with Olympique de Marseille on 6 December 2012 in the 2012–13 Europa League against Cypriot side AEL Limassol in a 3–0 loss. He came on as a substitute for Billel Omrani in the 63rd minute.

References

External links
 
 

1994 births
Living people
Footballers from Marseille
Association football midfielders
French footballers
French expatriate footballers
Olympique de Marseille players
FC Montceau Bourgogne players
Aubagne FC players
FC Lusitanos players
Primera Divisió players
Championnat National 2 players
Championnat National 3 players
French expatriate sportspeople in Andorra
Expatriate footballers in Andorra